Jela Spiridonović-Savić (11 January 1890 - September 1974) was a Serbian poet.

Biography
Jelena "Jela" Spiridonović-Savić was born in Šabac, Kingdom of Serbia, 11 January 1890. She was the wife of a prominent Consul general of Yugoslavia in New York City, Vladislav Savić. She spent three years in Trieste before World War I studying at the parochial school of Nostra Signora della Provvidenza e di Sion (Notre Dame de Sion Parish School). Educated in the world's centers of culture, New York, Munich, Trieste, and Monaco, she had the opportunity to intersect the Orthodox theology as part of her traditional heritage with ideas of Western Christianity, especially in the area of mystical spirituality. Having researched the mosaic of Christian spirituality, Spiridonović opened the questions about the metaphysical aspects of the world, as well as practical activities of the woman according to religious principles. Religious mysticism is deeply incorporated into the spiritual essence of her poetry, prose and essays. Her essays are based on the postulates of the scientific literature on feminist theory, which raises questions, rediscovering marginalized writers and offering new interpretations of their works. She died in Belgrade, Yugoslavia, September 1974.

Published works
 Čežnje: izabrana dela (Čežnje: Collected works; 2012)
 Susreti (1944)
 Pripovetke (1939)

References

Sources
 Jela Spiridonović-Savić, Večite čežnje, 1926
Jela Spiridonović-Savić, Pergamene rinvenute e trascritte dal fratello in cristo Stratonico, 1927
Francesco Babudri Intimi conflitti dello spirito umano nel poemetto di Jela Spiridonović-Savić
Umberto Urbanaz-Urbani Jela Spiridonović-Savić e le sue liriche

1891 births
1974 deaths
Serbian women poets
Yugoslav poets
Yugoslav women writers
20th-century women writers